Events from the year 1763 in France

Incumbents
 Monarch – Louis XV

Events

10 February – The Treaty of Paris formally ended the Seven Years' War.

Births
24 January – Jean-Nicolas Bouilly, playwright, librettist, children's writer, and politician (died 1842)

Full date missing
Pierre-Charles Villeneuve, naval officer (died 1806)
Joseph Chabran, military officer (died 1843)
Étienne Méhul, composer (died 1817)

Deaths

Full date missing
Jean-François Oeben, cabinetmaker (born 1721)
Jean Daullé, engraver (born 1703)

See also

References